The United States women's national field hockey team, represents the United States in international field hockey. The team is currently coached by Anthony Farry. It made its first international appearance in 1920 when a touring team visited England, coached by Constance M.K. Applebee. The team made several international appearances in the early 20th century, leading to the United States hosting the eighth International Federation of Women's Hockey Associations Tournament in 1963. Once the IFWHA merged with its counterpart on the men's side, the United States' first appearance at an FIH-sanctioned tournament was the 1983 Women's Hockey World Cup in Kuala Lumpur, Malaysia, where the Americans ended up in sixth place. They have won bronze at the Los Angeles 1984 Summer Olympics and bronze at the 1994 World Cup.

Olympics

Los Angeles 1984 Olympics
During the 1984 Summer Olympics, the team won their first international prize, a bronze medal. This happened after the Netherlands defeated Australia (2–0) in the final match of the round-robin tournament and Australia and the United States were left tied for third place with identical records: two wins, two losses, one draw, and nine goals scored and seven goals conceded. Following the Holland-Australia match, the United States players came down from the stands and competed with the Australians in a penalty shoot-out to decide the bronze medal. The US won the shootout (10–5) to claim America's first Olympic medal in women's field hockey.

Beijing 2008 Olympics
The Olympic qualifying squad placed first in the second series of games during the 2008 Women's Hockey Olympic Qualifier. At the Olympics, the team finished fourth in pool B and lost the seventh/eight place play-off to Germany 2–4,  finishing in eighth place.

London 2012 Olympics
The USWNT qualified for the London 2012 Summer Olympics after defeating Argentina 4–2 at the Pan American Games in Guadalajara, Mexico. The U.S. had high hopes of finishing their rocky 2012 Olympic campaign on a high note. Unfortunately, that did not happen for Team USA as the final match at Riverbank Arena in London's Olympic Park ended with a disappointing 2–1 loss to Belgium, leaving the U.S. with a last place finish in the tournament.

Rio 2016 Olympics

In similar fashion to qualifying for the London 2012 Olympics, the USWNT defeated Argentina at the Pan American Games in Toronto, Canada to punch their ticket to the Rio 2016 Summer Olympics. In pool play the USWNT toppled both global hockey powerhouses Argentina (2nd FIH World Ranked) and Australia (3rd FIH World Ranked) with the same score of 2–1. Continuing in their preliminary schedule, the US pushed past Japan (6–1) and India (3–0). The match in quarter-final play with Great Britain blemished the undefeated record of USWNT snd resulted in a loss, 2–1. They placed fifth.

Tournament history

Team

Current squad
The following 24 players were named in the United States squad for the FIH Pro League matches in Wellington and Hobart.

Caps are current as of 27 February 2023 after the match against New Zealand.

Head coach:  David Passmore

Notable players

 Beth Anders
 Katie Bam
 Kate Barber
 Beth Beglin
 Jackie Briggs
 Lauren Crandall
 Rachel Dawson
 Katelyn Falgowski
 Stefanie Fee
 Kris Fillat
 Tracey Fuchs
 Melissa González
 Sheryl Johnson
 Michelle Kasold
 Barbara Marois
 Charlene Morett-Curtiss
 Marcia Pankratz
 Elizabeth K. Ralph*
 Karen Shelton
 Amy Tran
 Michelle Vittese

Results

2022 Fixtures

FIH Pro League

See also
United States men's national field hockey team
USA Field Hockey
USA Field Hockey Hall of Fame

References

External links

FIH profile

National
Americas women's national field hockey teams
Women